Pikavere may refer to several places in Estonia:

Pikavere, Harju County, village in Raasiku Parish, Harju County
Pikavere, Pärnu County, village in Koonga Parish, Pärnu County